Sangrampur is a Nagar Panchayat, a tehsil of Buldhana district, Maharashtra State,  India.

Geography and climate 
It is located in the Buldhana district of the Amravati division of the Vidarbha region of the Maharashtra state in India.

It borders the Jalgaon Jamod tehsil to the north, the Shegaon tehsil of the Buldhana District to the south, the Telhara tehsil of the Akola District to the east and the Burhanpur District of the Madhya Pradesh State to the north.

It has an average elevation of 273 metres (898 feet).

The Maharashtra State Highways 173, 194 and 195 pass through the tehsil and connect to the following: 
 173 ( Shegaon - Warwat Bakal - Bawanbir - Tunki ), connecting Khamgaon on National Highway 6 from Shegaon.
 194 ( Khandvi - Jalgaon Jamod - Tunki - Sonala - Akot - Daryapur - Nandgaon), connecting National Highway 6 at both ends at Nandura on Khandvi side and at Nadgaon 
 195 ( Jalgaon Jamod - Sangrampur - Warwat Bakal - Telhara - Warula)  connecting MH SH 194 and MH SH 24.

The town post office Postal Index Number ( PIN code) is 444202 and PIN is shared with Palsi Zasi, Kakanwada, Warwat Bakal post offices.

Sangrampur is located at latitude 21.03° North and longitude 76.68° East. It is at an altitude of 896 ft (273 m) above sea level. Sangrampur has a subtropical steppe climate (Köppen climate classification Bsh)
Annual temperatures range from a high of 45.1 °C (113.18 °F) to a low of 5.7 °C (42.26 °F).

Summers starts at end of March and it tills to start of June. Sangrampur lies on the Tropic of Cancer and becomes very hot during the summer, especially in May. It is cooler at night. Humidity is always low below 25%. Highest temperature ever recorded in summer is 45.1 °C in the month of May.

Winters start here in mid October to till February. Winters are very cold at night to warm and breezy in day. Record low temperature was recorded was 5.7 °C. Winter period is pleasant period of the year with blue clear skies.

Because of Monsoon influenced, monsoon starts from early June with heavy rains in the months of July, August and September. Most of the rainfall occurs in the monsoon season between June and September, but some rain does fall during January and February.

On the north, Sangrampur is bordered by the Satpura Hills and forest region.

Demographics
 India census, Sangrampur had a population of 6,506.
As of the 2011, Sangrampur had a population of 7,258.

Sangrampur Tehsil
Sangrampur tehsil is part of the Jalgaon Jamod Sub-Division for Revenue of the Buldhana district, along with the Jalgaon Jamod Tehsil.

Some of these villages and their population are:

1-Chunkhedi 236  
2-Mohokot 109  
3-Anyar 14 
4-Mangeri 33 
5-Ambabarwa 445  
6-Rohin Khindki 848  
7-Salwan 200
8-Kamod 29 
9-Pingli Kh. 621   
10-Pingli Bk. 477 
11-Saykhed 1875 
12-Alewadi 2314  
13-Chichari 1174  
14-Wasali 2573  
15-Hadiya Mahal 487 
16-Shivani 1141  
17-Karmoda 788 
18-Shewaga Kh. 187  
19-Malthana Bk. 244  
20-Shewaga Bk 169 
21-Marod 576  
22-Lohagaon Bk. 381  
23-Ladnapur 1946  
24-Tunki Kh. 476  
25-Panchala Pr.jamod 223  
26-Panchala Pr.Bawanbir 226 
27-Tunki Bk. 4625  
28-Sonala 11626  
29-Borkhed 278  
30-Sangrampur Pr.sonala 184
31-Warkhed 84 
32-Sagoda 1987  
33-Danapur 104  
34-Balhadi 56  
35-Khalad Bk. 143 
36-Palsoda 1236  
37-Bawanbir 5898  
38-Umara 782  
39-Zasi 555  
40-Nimkhed 362  
41-Sawala or Sawali 577  
42-Dhamangaon 1019  
43-Palshi Zasi 3141  
44-Warwat Bakal 4976  
45-Banoda Eklara 2903  
46-Kakanwada Bk. 1462  
47-Kated 890  
48-Wadgaon Pr Adgaon 1305  
49-Kolad 1216  
50-Kakanwada Khurd. 1010 
51-Mominabad 449  
52-Pimpari Adgaon 1400  
53-Rajpur 157  
54-Akoli Bk. 910  
55-Akoli Kh. 251  
56-Changefal Bk. 665  
57-Changefal Kh. 707  
58-Niwana 1487  
59-Sangrampur Pr.jamod 6506  
60-Tamgaon 1124 
61-Pimpri Kathargaon 566  
62-Bodkha 1363 
63-Nirod 989  
64-Bhilkhed 713  
65-Wakana 1420  
66-Rudhana 2072  
67-Chondhi 622  
68-Kakoda 669  
69-Ukadgaon 353  
70-Manardi 719 
71-Pimpri Kavthal 461  
72-Ringanwadi 570  
73-Durgadiatya 1016 
74-Wankhed 5378 
75-Takleshwar 501  
76-Kalamkhed 712  
77-Jastgaon 795  
78-Neknapur 358  
79-Awar 955  
80-Ukali Bk. 1216 
81-Kodri 1225  
82-Paturda Khurd 1564  
83-Khel Thorat Paturda 2054  
84-Warwat Khanderao 1447  
85-Hingana Kavthal 360  
86-Kumbarkhed 230  
87-Kavthal 2673 
88-Itkhed 218  
89-Pesoda 1185  
90-Bhon 1149 
91-Sawali 659  
92-Khiroda 1073  
93-Khel Dalavi Paturda 1803  
94-Khel Bhogal Paturda 2346  
95-Deulgaon 235  
96-Khel Mali Paturda 1981  
97-Takali Panchgavhan 503  
98-Kundhegaon 275  
99-Aswand 350. 
Nimkhed, Salabad, Kalamkhed?

Agriculture is the main occupation within the tehsil and Sangrampur has an Agricultural Produce Market Committee (APMC) (Krishi Utpann Bajar samiti), with a subcommittee at Paturda, Warwat Bakal and Sonala.

References
http://www.census2011.co.in/data/village/528353-sangrampur-pr-jamod-maharashtra.html

Cities and towns in Buldhana district
Talukas in Maharashtra